Lusaka City Airport  is a military airport serving Lusaka, Zambia. It is used by the Zambian Air Force and the government, while international and commercial traffic is served by Kenneth Kaunda International Airport.

Runway 08 has an unusual  displaced threshold (no touchdown section), located  past the normal threshold.

There are numerous non-directional beacons in the area associated with approaches to the nearby international airport.

See also

Transport in Zambia
List of airports in Zambia

References

External links
OpenStreetMap - Lusaka City Airport
SkyVector - Lusaka City Airport

Airports in Zambia
Buildings and structures in Lusaka Province